Diel Reon Spring (born December 26, 2000) is a Vincentian footballer who plays as a midfielder for Polish side Podlasie Biała Podlaska and the Saint Vincent and the Grenadines national team.

Early years
Spring hails from the village of Chateaubelair. His mother is a chef and his father is a construction worker while his grandparents were farmers.

He led St Martin’s Secondary School to a junior division title in the 2015 Secondary Schools’ Football Competition, scoring a brace in the final. The following year he was named best midfielder of the Barrouallie Football League under-17 division as a member of the North Leeward Predators youth set-up.

He also participated in sports such as athletics and cricket.

Club career
During the 2017 season in the second-tier SVGFF First Division, Spring helped the Predators finish the regular season undefeated and reach the championship final, where he scored the opening goal of the match as they defeated Largo Height via penalty shoot-out. He was nominated for Youth Male Player of the Year at the 2017 National Football Awards. That same year, he and future international teammate Joel Quashie were chosen as the winners of a Caribbean Football Union- and Manchester United-backed skills-based competition for young talents, earning invitations to a talent development camp in Trinidad and Tobago.

The next season, Spring captained the Predators to a runner-up league finish in the SVGFF Premier Division and a Knock Out Cup title. He recorded a brace against Bequia United in week 10, and repeated the feat against System 3 in week 17. He finished the season with a hat-trick in a 4–1 win against Largo Height on the final match-day. At the end of the year he was named Best Midfielder at the National Football Awards.

In the summer of 2020, he signed a deal with Wisła Sandomierz in the Polish III liga. He admits his time at the club was not ideal, having only played a few matches due to injuries and other problems.

On 26 July 2021, Spring moved to another III liga side, Podlasie Biała Podlaska. Here he was coached by Rafał Borysiuk, brother of Ariel Borysiuk.

International career

Youth team
In November 2018, he represented the national under-20 team at the 2018 CONCACAF U-20 Championship, playing in all five matches.

Senior team
On 8 September 2018, Spring made his debut for Saint Vincent and the Grenadines in the qualifying rounds of the 2019–20 CONCACAF Nations League against Nicaragua. He came on as a halftime substitution for Wendell Cuffy in the 2–0 defeat at home. He was called up again later that month, earning his second international cap three weeks later during a friendly against a Barbados XI made up mostly of under-20 players preparing for the 2018 CONCACAF U-20 Championship. He came on after halftime yet again, this time for Brad Richards, in the 1–1 draw. He made two further appearances in CONCACAF Nations League qualifying to finish the year.

In February 2019, Spring was named to the 20-man squad selected to play at the 2019 Windward Islands Tournament on home soil. He played in all four matches as Saint Vincent and the Grenadines won their fifth title.

Career statistics

International

Honours

Club
Fitz Hughes Predators
 Knock Out Cup: 2019
 SVGFF First Division: 2017

Individual
 SVGFF Best Midfielder: 2019
 SVGFF Youth Male Player of the Year: 2017

International
Saint Vincent and the Grenadines
 Windward Islands Tournament: 2019

References

External links
 Diel Spring at Caribbean Football Database
 
 
 
 Diel Spring at 90minut.pl

Living people
2000 births
Saint Vincent and the Grenadines footballers
Saint Vincent and the Grenadines international footballers
Association football midfielders
Saint Vincent and the Grenadines expatriate footballers
Saint Vincent and the Grenadines expatriate sportspeople in Poland
Expatriate footballers in Poland
III liga players
People from Saint David Parish, Saint Vincent and the Grenadines
Saint Vincent and the Grenadines youth international footballers
Saint Vincent and the Grenadines under-20 international footballers